The 2018 Supercopa de Chile (known as the 2018 Súper Copa MG for sponsorship purposes) was the sixth edition of the Supercopa de Chile, championship organised by the Asociación Nacional de Fútbol Profesional (ANFP). The match was played by the 2017 Chilean Primera División champions Colo-Colo and the 2017 Copa Chile winners Santiago Wanderers. Colo-Colo were the champions after winning 3–0 in normal time.

Teams

The two teams that contested the Supercopa were Colo-Colo, who qualified as 2017 Transición champions and Santiago Wanderers, who qualified for the match as the 2017 Copa Chile winners, defeating Universidad de Chile 3–1 at the Estadio Ester Roa.

Details

References

2018 in Chilean football
Colo-Colo matches